Beast of the East may refer to:

Beast of the East (rugby), a college rugby tournament
Beast of the East (wrestling), a high school wrestling tournament
Killington Ski Resort, a ski area in the northeast United States

See also
Beast from the East (disambiguation)